Jacqueline Charles is an American journalist and Pulitzer Prize finalist. Charles is an Emmy Award-winning Caribbean Correspondent at the Miami Herald.

Biography
Charles was born on Grand Turk Island of the Turks and Caicos. She was raised an only child of a Haitian mother and a Cuban stepfather and moved to the United States at the age of seven, where they settled in Miami. She began her career in journalism in 1986 as a 14-year-old high school intern at the Miami Herald. She is a graduate of Miami Jackson High School, Booker T. Washington Junior High and Dunbar Elementary in Overtown, and the University of North Carolina at Chapel Hill's School of Journalism and Mass Communication in 1994.

Before assuming the role on foreign issues, Charles' coverage was local, mainly on the impoverished areas of Miami.

Awards
Charles has won the NABJ Journalist of the Year for coverage of the devastating Haiti 2010 earthquake, and a 2011 Pulitzer Prize finalist for that same coverage. She won a Regional Emmy for her role as co-producer on the Herald produced-documentary, "Nou Bouke" (We are fed up) from the Academy of Television Arts & Sciences. The Miami New Times newspaper named her Reporter of the Year. She also won the 2011 Paul Hansell Award, named in honor of a longtime Florida bureau chief for The Associated Press. In 2018 she was awarded the Maria Moors Cadet prize for her coverage of the 2010 earthquake in Haïti.

References

Date of birth unknown
Living people
American women journalists
American people of Haitian descent
American people of Turks and Caicos Islands descent
UNC Hussman School of Journalism and Media alumni
People from Miami
Turks and Caicos Islands emigrants to the United States
Writers from Miami
Year of birth missing (living people)
21st-century American women